Case Histories is the debut studio album of American noise rock and Industrial music band Pain Teens, released in July 1989 by Anomie Records.

Track listing

Personnel 
Adapted from the Case Histories liner notes.

Pain Teens
 Scott Ayers – guitar, bass guitar, electronics, production, engineering
 Bliss Blood – lead vocals

Additional musicians and production
 Austin Caustic – tape (B2)
 David Parker – drums (A2, B1)
 Frank Kozik – cover art

Release history

References

External links 
 Case Histories at Bandcamp
 

1989 albums
Pain Teens albums
Albums produced by Scott Ayers